North Eastern Savonia or Northeastern Savo is a sub-region of Finland. It is an administrative subdivision of the region of North Savo.

The region of Northeast Savo was named a region of sudden structural change during 2008 to 2010, after Stromsdal, a major employer in the region, went bankrupt.

Municipalities 

Northeastern Savo previously comprised five municipalities: Juankoski, Kaavi, Nilsiä, Rautavaara, and Tuusniemi. 

On 1 January 2013, Nilsiä was incorporated into the city of Kuopio, a part of the Kuopio sub-region, and was thus removed from Northeastern Savo.

On 1 January 2017, Juankoski was incorporated into the city of Kuopio. With the removal of Juankoski from the Northeastern Savo sub-region, the land connection between Rautavaara and the rest of the sub-region was broken.

The sub-region currently comprises the municipalities of Kaavi, Rautavaara, and Tuusniemi.

Population
The sub-region had a population of 19,837 in 2011. In December 2021, the population was 6,711.

Politics
Results of the 2018 Finnish presidential election:

 Sauli Niinistö   60.9%
 Matti Vanhanen   10.0%
 Paavo Väyrynen   9.6%
 Laura Huhtasaari   6.4%
 Pekka Haavisto   5.3%
 Merja Kyllönen   4.4%
 Tuula Haatainen   3.2%
 Nils Torvalds   0.1%

References

Sub-regions of Finland
Geography of North Savo